Rachel Wyatt (born 1929 in Bradford, England) is an English-Canadian dramatist.

Wyatt emigrated to Canada with her family in 1957. She has written scores of plays for the BBC and Canadian Broadcasting Corporation. Wyatt was appointed as a member of the Order of Canada in 2002 and awarded the Queen's Golden Jubilee Medal in 2003.

Novels
 The String Box (1970)
 The Rosedale Hoax (1977) 
 Foreign Bodies (1982) 
 Time in the Air (1985) 
 Mona Lisa Smiled a Little (1999) 
 Time's Reach (2003)

Short story collections
 The Day Marlene Dietrich Died (1996) 
 The Last We Heard of Leonard (2004) 
 The Magician's Beautiful Assistant (2005)

Biographies
 Agnes Macphail (2000)Dundurn Press

Sources
 Bloomsbury Guide to Women's Literature

References

External links
 Literary archives
 Order of Canada
 The Magician's Beautiful Assistant
 Banff Centre
 List of Books, Plays, Readings, Awards, etc
 Agnes Macphail by Rachel Wyatt
 Archives of Rachel Wyatt (Rachel Wyatt fonds, R11832) are held at Library and Archives Canada

1929 births
Living people
Writers from Bradford
English dramatists and playwrights
Canadian women dramatists and playwrights
English emigrants to Canada
English women writers
20th-century Canadian dramatists and playwrights
Canadian women novelists
20th-century Canadian novelists
Canadian women short story writers
British women short story writers
20th-century Canadian women writers
20th-century Canadian short story writers
20th-century English women
20th-century English people